Boris Pineda (28 November 1958 – 11 October 2021) was a Salvadoran engineer and chess player who is considered the most successful player in the history of El Salvador. The National Institute of Sports of El Salvador named him "Chess Player of the 20th century".

Career

He won the Salvadoran Chess Championship a record 8 times (1976, 1977, 1978, 1991, 1992, 1996, 1998 and 2003). He was also the only Salvadoran chess player ever to win two medals worldwide: a team gold medal at the Against Chess Olympiad held in Tripoli in 1976, and an individual silver at the 29th Chess Olympiad held in Novi Sad in 1990. He also received the recognition of "Sportsman of the Year" by the Circle of Sport Informers (CID) in 1975, and the " " in 1990 and 1994.

References

External Links
FIDE Rating

1958 births
2021 deaths
Salvadoran engineers
Salvadoran chess players